Butler is a city and the county seat of Butler County, Pennsylvania, United States. As of the 2020 census, the city population was 13,502.

History 

Butler was named for Maj. Gen. Richard Butler, who fell at the Battle of the Wabash, also known as St. Clair's Defeat, in western Ohio in 1791.

In 1803, John and Samuel Cunningham became the first settlers in the village of Butler. After settling in Butler, the two brothers laid out the community by drawing up plots of land for more incoming settlers. By 1817, the community was incorporated into a borough. The first settlers were of Irish or Scottish descent and were driving westward from Connecticut. In 1802, the German immigrants began arriving, with Detmar Basse settling in Jackson Township in 1802 and founding Zelienople the following year. After George Rapp arrived in 1805 and founded Harmony, larger numbers of settlers followed. John A. Roebling settled Saxonburg in 1832, by which time most of the county was filled with German settlers.

Butler incorporated into a city in 1918.

The first Butler library originated in 1894 with the Literary Society of Butler in what is now known as the Little Red Schoolhouse. The Butler Area Public Library, built in 1921, was the last Carnegie library to be built in Pennsylvania. In the intervening 27 years the library was independently operated. From 1921 to 1941 the library  quadrupled the number of patrons served.

Rail and automobile
In its heyday, the city of Butler was a "Steel Belt" manufacturing and industrial area. It remains home to an AK Steel factory. In 1902, the Standard Steel Car Company opened one of its largest railcar manufacturing facilities in Butler. It was here that some of the first all-steel rail cars were built. Diamond Jim Brady, the legendary financier, gourmand and gem enthusiast, established the Standard Steel Car Company in 1902, which merged with the Pullman Palace Car Company in 1934, creating Pullman-Standard, a monopoly that was eventually broken by the government.

About 2,500 workers produced 60 steel-bed railroad cars per day in 1902. Eastern European immigrants were lured to the area in the early 20th century with the promise of reliable jobs, which offered company housing and a company store.  The company constructed a baseball park which was the home of a New York Yankees farm team. The steel workers of Butler made artillery and naval shells during World War II.

The Pullman-Standard plant closed in 1982, but 
was purchased in 1984 by Trinity Industries. Trinity Industries left the factory in 1993, and the factory was completely demolished in 2005. The site is now occupied by a vacant strip mall, as well as the Butler Transit Authority inter-modal facility. In 2011 the BTA moved a covered hopper rail-car, built in 1974, to the bus terminal in recognition of the former Pullman-Standard plant.

The American Austin Car Company (1929–1941) was headquartered in the area. Later the firm changed its name to American Bantam Car Company. Bantam was an early producer of small fuel-efficient vehicles through the 1930s. In 1940, lead engineer Karl Probst led Bantam design team to create what later was termed the iconic WWII Jeep. Sizeable military contracts eventually went to Willys and Ford, as the Bantam factory had floundered. Today, a controversial monument stands near the courthouse commemorating Bantam's "creation of the Jeep".

Butler is home to one of the early Ford dealerships, established in 1918 and still extant.

At one point, the Rainbow Rubber Company, in the late 1930s, made "Rubrtoy" replicas of Oldsmobiles along with many other rubber toys.

In the 1950s, Butler became one of the first cities to install bells at crosswalks, a common practice today.  Pedestrians could cross in either direction.

The city was linked to Pittsburgh via Mars, Pennsylvania, in 1907 by the Pittsburgh and Butler Street Railway, and to Evans City in 1908 by the Pittsburgh, Harmony, Butler and New Castle Railway, both interurban trolley lines. The Mars route closed in April 1931, followed by the Evans City line on August 15, 1931, with the trolleys replaced by buses.

Like most of the region, by the end of the 1970s, the local economy changed dramatically. Manufacturing virtually ended and well-paying jobs became scarce.

Geography 

Connoquenessing Creek is the only waterway to pass through the city. In 2000, a scientific study was conducted to determine the health of the creek. Researchers discovered that only the Mississippi River received more toxic materials than the Connoquenessing, making the small river the second most polluted waterway in the United States. At the time, the Armco Inc. steel facility in Butler ranked first nationally for the amount of pollutant discharges. However, by 2010, due to reduced industry and clean up efforts, the creek's health has significantly recovered and has become popular for water-sport activities.

Neighborhoods 
The city of Butler has six labeled neighborhoods:
 Institute Hill
 The Island
 North Butler
 South Hills
 South Side
 West End

Climate

Demographics 

As of the census of 2000, there were 15,121 people, 6,740 households, and 3,626 families residing in the city. The population density was 5,611.3 people per square mile (2,170.4/km). There were 7,402 housing units at an average density of 2,746.8 per square mile (1,062.4/km). The racial makeup of the city was 93.6% White, 2.7% African American, 0.2% Native American, 0.5% Asian, 0.52% from other races, and 1.14% from two or more races. Hispanic or Latino of any race were 4.88% of the population.

There were 6,740 households, out of which 26.8% had children under the age of 18 living with them, 35.0% were married couples living together, 14.4% had a female householder with no husband present, and 46.2% were non-families. 40.7% of all households were made up of individuals, and 16.3% had someone living alone who was 65 years of age or older. The average household size was 2.18 and the average family size was 2.96.

In the city, the population was spread out, with 23.7% under the age of 18, 9.7% from 18 to 24, 30.3% from 25 to 44, 20.2% from 45 to 64, and 16.1% who were 65 years of age or older. The median age was 36 years. For every 100 females, there were 88.1 males. For every 100 females age 18 and over, there were 83.9 males.

The median income for a household in the city was $25,154, and the median income for a family was $35,893. Males had a median income of $30,607 versus $20,950 for females. The per capita income for the city was $16,457. About 14.7% of families and 19.1% of the population were below the poverty line, including 26.8% of those under age 18 and 14.5% of those age 65 or over.

Economy 
Major employers:
 Walmart
 AK Steel
 Armstrong Group of Companies
 Penn United Technologies
 VA Butler Healthcare
 Butler Area School District
 Butler Health System

Arts and culture 
The Butler Little Theatre has been running productions continuously since 1941. The Musical Theater Guild produces an annual musical production.  In 2012, Hobnob Theatre Company began producing several plays, including an annual production of Charles Dickens' A Christmas Carol.

The Maridon Museum is the only museum in the Western Pennsylvania region with a specific focus on Chinese and Japanese art and culture.

The Little Red School House is a former one-room schoolhouse that taught students from 1839 to 1874. Throughout its history, it has been a post office, library and Red Cross headquarters. It became a museum in 1966 and is run by the Butler County Historical Society.

Butler is home to the Butler County Symphony Association, which performs at the Butler Intermediate High School auditorium.

The city features artist groups including the Associated Artists of Butler County and the Butler Arts Council, which host galleries and live events at the Art Center, located on Main Street.

Stewart O'Nan's prizewinning 1994 novel Snow Angels is set in Butler, with the protagonist being a local high school student. However, the 2007 film adaption, shot in Canada, removes all references to Butler.

Stephen King's 2002 novel From A Buick 8 takes place in the area.

Charles Cingolani penned an entire book of poetry about the area in The Butler Pennsylvania Poems (2010).

The city was the setting for several scenes in the 2015 novel trilogy Benjamin's Field by local author J. J. Knights.

Events 
The Butler Road Race, a 5-mile and 2-mile race held each summer in June, raises scholarship funding for local students.

The Butler Italian Festival is an annual street fair that features ethnic foods, live music and events.

The Bantam Jeep Heritage Festival, the Largest Jeep Festival in the US, is held annually in June with off-road trails, a Jeep Playground obstacle course, and the "original" Jeep Invasion street party.

Historical sites 

The following structures are listed in the National Register of Historic Places 
The Butler Armory is a National Guard armory located on Washington Street. Built in 1922, it was designed by architect Joseph F. Kuntz with W.G. Wilkins, Co. and expanded in 1930.
 The Butler County Courthouse is a government and judicial building located in the heart of the city. The plaza across the street, Diamond Park, displays various war memorials.
 The Butler County National Bank, also known as the Lafayette Building and Butler Branch Mellon Bank, it is considered the first "skyscraper" in Butler. It was built in 1902–1903, and is a six-story, five bay by five bay, brick and stone building in the French Renaissance Revival style. A two-story addition was built in 1929. The building housed Butler's post office from 1903 to 1913. The building was rehabilitated into an apartment building in 1992–1993.
 The Butler Historic District is a national historic district which includes 128 contributing buildings, 1 contributing site, and 4 contributing objects in the central business district of Butler. It includes primarily commercial and institutional buildings, with some residential buildings, built between about 1828 and 1952 in a number of popular architectural styles including Late Victorian. Located in the district and listed separately are the Butler County Courthouse, the Butler County National Bank, and the Sen. Walter Lowrie House.
 The Senator Walter Lowrie House was the home of United States Senator Walter Lowrie, built in 1828, and is the headquarters of the Butler County Historical Society. 
 Elm Court, often referred to as Phillips Mansion, is a historic Tudor-Gothic mansion designed by architect Benno Janssen and built in 1929-1930 for Benjamin D. Phillips, son of T.W. Phillips, founder of T.W. Phillips Gas & Oil Co. Tucked away and hidden from view, it resides in the northeast corner of the city  and is privately owned by one of the Koch Brothers.

Sports 
Butler BlueSox, active from 2006 to present.
Michelle Krill Field at Historic Pullman Park (formerly known as Pullman Park until 2014), built in 1934, was used for minor league baseball for twenty years until the Pittsburgh Pirates farm team left in 1951. The ballpark saw many famous faces during its professional baseball days, including Lou Gehrig, Whitey Ford, and Joe DiMaggio, who played for a farm team of the New York Yankees. Revamped in 2008, the stadium is the home of the Butler BlueSox.
 The Butler Golden Tornadoes

Parks and recreation 
 Doughboy Park, primarily a memorial dedicated to those who lost their lives in World War I.
 Butler Memorial Park, once featured a community pool, but it has remained closed since the late 2000s.
 Father Marinaro Park, features a skateboard park. 
 Ritts Park, a small park in the northernmost portion of the city with various courts.
 Rotary Park, a curved park near the Pullman baseball park.

Education 
 Butler Area School District
 Butler Junior High School

Center Avenue Community School

Emily Brittain Elementary
 Butler County Area Vocational-Technical School
 Butler Catholic School
 Butler County Community College (BC3)

Media 
 The Butler Eagle, daily newspaper
 WBUT, country music AM radio
 WISR, news, talk, and sports AM radio
 WLER, rock music FM radio
 Butler Radio Network, news website
 Armstrong Neighborhood Channel, a community TV and internet channel
 Golden Tornado Television, channel 204, the school district's channel that features school news, sports, events and student projects

Infrastructure

Transportation

Airports

There are two airports located outside the city. Butler County Airport is used for general aviation, and may accommodate large aircraft such as corporate jets. Butler Farm Show Airport is used by pilots with smaller, private aircraft.

Pittsburgh International Airport is nearby.

Mass transit
Butler is served by The Bus, run by the Butler Transit Authority. The Butler Transit Authority also offers a Commuter service, which operates between Butler and the City of Pittsburgh.

Railroads
Two railroads currently offer freight service in Butler. The Canadian National Railway-owned Bessemer and Lake Erie Railroad main line passes through the city, while the Buffalo and Pittsburgh Railroad provides regional service in the area. The B&P has a large locomotive shop located just outside the city limits.

Roads
Five major highways run through or near the city, providing links to other areas throughout Western Pennsylvania. The south terminus of Pennsylvania Route 38 is just north of the city at U.S. Route 422. Route 422 skirts the city, to the north, on the Butler Bypass. PA 68 and PA 356 go straight through downtown, where they intersect with PA 8 (Butler's Main Street).

Notable people

Sports 
Major League Baseball:
 Matt Clement (born 1974), former MLB pitcher, All-Star, member of 2007 World Series champion Boston Red Sox
 Milt Graff (1930–2005), former MLB second baseman for the Kansas City Athletics (1957-1958)
 Khalil Greene (born 1979), former MLB player, San Diego Padres (2003-2008) and the St. Louis Cardinals (2009)
 Don Kelly (born 1980), former MLB utility player for multiple teams, currently the bench coach for the Pittsburgh Pirates  
 Jerry Meals (born 1961), current MLB umpire
 John Stuper (born 1957), former MLB pitcher for the St. Louis Cardinals (1982-1985) and Cincinnati Reds (1985) and current coach of the Yale Bulldogs
 Ed Vargo (1928–2008), MLB umpire (1960s-1970s)

National Football League:
 Rich Bartlewski (born 1967), former NFL tight end for the Los Angeles Raiders (1990) and Atlanta Falcons (1991) 
 Tom Brown (1921–2013), former NFL tight end for the Pittsburgh Steelers (1942) 
 Terry Hanratty (born 1948), All-American and Sammy Baugh Trophy winning quarterback (1967) for Notre Dame
 Mike Koken (1909–1962), professional football player, for the Chicago Cardinals
 Scott Milanovich (born 1973), former NFL, NFL Europe, XFL, AFL, and CFL quarterback. Coached multiple CFL teams and is the head coach for the Edmonton Eskimos
 Paul Posluszny (born 1984), two-time All-American linebacker for Penn State University. Former NFL linebacker for the Buffalo Bills (2007-2010) and the Jacksonville Jaguars (2011-2017).
 Bill Saul (1940–2006), former NFL linebacker for multiple teams (1962-1970). Older brother of Rich and Ron.
 Rich Saul (1948–2012), former NFL center lineman for the Los Angeles Rams (1970-1981). Six-time Pro Bowler. 
 Ron Saul (1948–2021), former NFL guard lineman for the Houston Oilers (1970-1975) and Washington Redskins (1976-1981). Younger brother of Bill, twin brother of Rich.
Paul Uram (1926–2017), former NFL flexibility and kicking coach for the Pittsburgh Steelers (1973-1981).

Sports, other:
 Jake Hildebrand (born 1993), ECHL hockey player for the Kalamazoo Wings
 Harry Holiday (1923–1999), world record-setting swimmer and Armco CEO
 Brian Minto (born 1975), former heavyweight boxer (2002-2016)
 John Minton (1948–1995), former professional wrestler known by the name Big John Studd.
 Ethan Morton (born 2001), basketball player for Purdue University
 Eric Namesnik (1970–2006), two-time silver medalist Olympic swimmer for men's 400-meter individual relay (1992 & 1996)
 David Pichler (born 1968), Olympic diver (1996 & 2000), dive team captain in 2000, did not place 
 Meghan Schnur (born 1985), is an NSCAA All-American for University of Connecticut (2007) and an American soccer midfielder

Film, stage and television
Chester Aaron (1932–2019), author with over two dozen publications  
 Marc Blucas (born 1972), actor, best known by his portrayal of Riley Finn in Buffy the Vampire Slayer
 Joan Chandler (1923–1979), actress, best known for her roles in Alfred Hitchcock's Rope (1948) with James Stewart and Humoresque (1946)
 Josie Carey (1930–2004), the host of The Children's Corner on WQED in Pittsburgh. 
 Barbara Feldon (born 1933), actress and model, best known as Agent 99 of the TV series Get Smart  
 Grace Gealey (born 1984), actress, portrayed 'Anika' on the Fox series Empire
 Fred McCarren (1951–2006), actor, best known for his roles in Amanda's (1983) and Hill Street Blues (1984).
 Michele Pawk (born 1961), actress (2003, Best Performance by a Featured Actress in a Play, Hollywood Arms)

Music
 About a Mile, a Christian rock band
 Jim Anderson (born 1951), sound engineer and producer
 Glenn Crytzer (born 1980), band leader and composer
 Bret Michaels (born 1963), lead singer of the rock band Poison
 Jim Pugh (born 1950), jazz trombonist and composer. 
 William Purvis (born 1948), French horn player, conductor and Musical Instruments Director at Yale University

Public office and military
 Gibson E. Armstrong (born 1943), former Republican PA State Representative 
 Judge William G. Bassler (born 1938), former United States district judge of the United States District Court for the District of New Jersey (1991-2006)
 Brian Ellis (born 1969), former Republican PA State Representative for the 11th House district (2005-2019)
 Admiral Jonathan W. Greenert (born 1953), former Chief of Naval Operations for the U.S. Navy (2011-2015). Highly decorated and awarded.
 Donald Oesterling (1927–2013), former Democratic PA State Senator for the 21st district from 1965 to 1972.
 William J. Perry (born 1927), Secretary of Defense under Bill Clinton (1994–1997). 
 Rick Santorum (born 1958), former Republican U.S. Senator from PA (1995-2007).
 Tim Shaffer (1945-2022), Pennsylvania state senator

Technology
 Jay Last (born 1929), physicist, silicon pioneer
 Carl Yankowski (born 1948), businessman and former CEO of Palm, Inc. and Ambient Devices.

Other
 Michele McDonald (1952–2020), Miss USA 1971, semi-finalist of Miss Universe 1971
 Daniel D'Aniello (born 1946), billionaire businessman
 Harold Dodds (1889–1980), president of Princeton University (1933-1957)
 Samuel Hall Young (1847–1927), prominent Alaska Presbyterian missionary

Further reading
Brown, Robert C.  History of Butler County, Pennsylvania:...Pioneers and Representative Citizens, Etc., Etc. [Chicago]: R.C. Brown & Co., 1895.  Chapter VI.Print.
An Historical Gazetteer of Butler County, Pennsylvania, Chicora: Mechling Bookbindery, 2006, .

See also

Butler Township, Butler County, Pennsylvania
Butler County, Pennsylvania
National Register of Historic Places listings in Butler County

References

External links

 City of Butler official website

 
Cities in Pennsylvania
County seats in Pennsylvania
Populated places established in 1802
Pittsburgh metropolitan area
Cities in Butler County, Pennsylvania